Ambohitromby  is a municipality in Analamanga Region, in the  Central Highlands of Madagascar, located north from the capital of Antananarivo.
The municipality lies along the National road No.4.

References
mindat.org

Populated places in Analamanga